Margaret Wetherell (born 24 November 1954) is a prominent academic in the area of discourse analysis.

Career
Wetherell worked for 23 years at the Open University, UK from which she retired as Emeritus Professor in 2011.  She then took up a part-time post of Professor in Psychology at the University of Auckland, New Zealand.

Work
Wetherell has promoted a discursive approach to psychology. Her 1987 book, Discourse and  Social Psychology: Beyond Attitudes and Behaviour, cowritten with Jonathan Potter, was very influential, particularly in social psychology, though also in other fields (e.g. Wood & Kroger, 2000). While discourse analysis has many different meanings, Wetherell's approach has been quite catholic in line with other anglophone discourse analysts like Gilbert & Mulkay (1984).

Wetherell asserts that social actions and routines are formed within our respective social organizations, and that we can not separate a bodies, talk, and text.

In 2010/11 she led a collaboration on identity funded by the UK Economic and Social Research Council (ESRC).

Selected bibliography

Books

Book chapters

Journal articles

Further reading

References

External links 
 Profile page: Margaret Wetherell Open University

1954 births
Academics of the Open University
British psychologists
Living people
Social psychologists
Sociolinguists
Discourse analysts